Central Idaho is a geographical term for the region located northeast of Boise and southeast of Lewiston in the U.S. state of Idaho. It is dominated by federal lands administered by the United States Forest Service and the Bureau of Land Management. Idaho's tallest mountain, Borah Peak, is located in this region. A large part of the Sawtooth National Recreation Area is within Central Idaho.

The counties of Blaine, Butte, Camas, Custer, and Lemhi are included in the region.

Cities
Arco
Bellevue
Carey
Challis
Fairfield
Hailey
Ketchum
Mackay
Picabo
Salmon
Stanley
Sun Valley

See also
Stibnite Mining District

External links
Official Idaho State Travel Site

Regions of Idaho